Antonijo Ježina (born 5 June 1989) is a Croatian footballer who most recently played for Osijek as a goalkeeper.

Club career
Ježina joined Belgian second tier-side Royal Antwerp in summer 2016.

International career
He made his debut for the Croatian senior national team on September 10, 2013, in a friendly match against South Korea. Entering the match as an injury time substitute for Dario Krešić, he conceded a goal in less than a minute he spent on the field.

References

External links
 
 Profile - RAFC Museum

1989 births
Living people
Sportspeople from Šibenik
Association football goalkeepers
Croatian footballers
Croatia under-21 international footballers
Croatia youth international footballers
Croatia international footballers
NK Zadar players
NK Istra 1961 players
GNK Dinamo Zagreb players
GNK Dinamo Zagreb II players
Royal Antwerp F.C. players
NK Slaven Belupo players
NK Osijek players
Croatian Football League players
First Football League (Croatia) players
Challenger Pro League players
Croatian expatriate footballers
Expatriate footballers in Belgium
Croatian expatriate sportspeople in Belgium